The People's Liberation Army Rocket Force (PLARF), formerly the Second Artillery Corps, is the strategic and tactical missile force of the People's Republic of China. The PLARF is the 4th branch of the People's Liberation Army (PLA) and controls China's arsenal of land-based ballistic missiles—both nuclear and conventional. The armed service branch was established on 1 July 1966 and made its first public appearance on 1 October 1984. The headquarters for operations is located at Qinghe, Beijing. The PLARF is under the direct command of the Chinese Communist Party's Central Military Commission (CMC).

In total, China is estimated to be in possession of 320 nuclear warheads as of 2020, with an unknown number of them active and ready to deploy. In 2013, the United States Department of Defense estimated the Chinese active ICBM arsenal to range between 50 and 75 land and sea-based missiles. More recent intelligence assessments in 2019 put China's ICBM count at around 90 and growing rapidly. The PLARF comprises approximately 120,000 personnel and six ballistic missile brigades. The six brigades are independently deployed in different military regions throughout China.

The name was changed from the PLA Second Artillery Corps to the PLA Rocket Force on 1 January 2016. Despite claims by some, there appears to be no evidence to suggest that the new generation of Chinese ballistic-missile submarines will come under PLARF control.

China has the largest land-based missile arsenal in the world. According to Pentagon estimates, this includes 1,200 conventionally armed short-range ballistic missiles, 200 to 300 conventional medium-range ballistic missiles and an unknown number of conventional intermediate-range ballistic missiles, as well as 200-300 ground-launched cruise missiles. Many of these are extremely accurate, which would allow them to destroy targets even without nuclear warheads.

History 

In the late 1980s, China was the world's third-largest nuclear power, possessing a small but credible nuclear deterrent force of approximately 100 to 400 nuclear weapons. Beginning in the late 1970s, China deployed a full range of nuclear weapons and acquired a nuclear second-strike capability. The nuclear forces were operated by the 100,000-person Strategic Missile Force, which was controlled directly by the General Staff.

China began developing nuclear weapons in the late 1950s with substantial Soviet assistance. With the Sino-Soviet split in the late 1950s and early 1960s, the Soviet Union withheld plans and data for an atomic bomb, abrogated the agreement on transferring defense and nuclear technology, and began the withdrawal of Soviet advisers in 1960. Despite the termination of Soviet assistance, China committed itself to continue nuclear weapons development to break "the superpowers' monopoly on nuclear weapons," to ensure Chinese security against the Soviet and American threats, and to increase Chinese prestige and power internationally.

China made rapid progress in the 1960s in developing nuclear weapons. In a 32-month period, China successfully tested its first atomic bomb on October 16, 1964, at Lop Nor, launched its first nuclear missile on October 27, 1966, and detonated its first hydrogen bomb on June 17, 1967. Deployment of the Dongfeng-1 conventionally armed short-range ballistic missile and the Dongfeng-2 (CSS-1) medium-range ballistic missile (MRBM) occurred in the 1960s. The Dongfeng-3 (CCS-2) intermediate-range ballistic missile (IRBM) was successfully tested in 1969. Although the Cultural Revolution disrupted the strategic weapons program less than other scientific and educational sectors in China, there was a slowdown in succeeding years.

Gansu hosted a missile launching area. China destroyed 9 U-2 surveillance craft while two went missing when they attempted to spy on it.

In the 1970s, the nuclear weapons program saw the development of MRBM, IRBM and ICBMs and marked the beginning of a deterrent force. China continued MRBM deployment, began deploying the Dongfeng-3 IRBM and successfully tested and commenced deployment of the Dongfeng-4 (CSS-4) limited-range ICBM.

By 1980, China had overcome the slowdown in nuclear development caused by the Cultural Revolution and had successes in its strategic weapons program. In May 1980, China successfully test launched its full-range ICBM, the Dongfeng-5 (CCS-4); the missile flew from central China to the Western Pacific, where it was recovered by a naval task force. The Dongfeng-5 possessed the capability to hit targets in the western Soviet Union and the United States.

In 1981, China launched three satellites into space orbit from a single launch vehicle, indicating that China might possess the technology to develop multiple independently targetable reentry vehicles (MIRVs). China also launched the Type 092 submarine SSBN (Xia-class) in 1981, and the next year it conducted its first successful test launch of the Julang-2 submarine-launched ballistic missile (CSS-NX-4).

In addition to the development of a sea-based nuclear force, China began considering the development of tactical nuclear weapons. PLA exercises featured the simulated use of tactical nuclear weapons in offensive and defensive situations beginning in 1982. Reports of Chinese possession of tactical nuclear weapons had remained unconfirmed in 1987.

In 1986, China possessed a credible deterrent force with land, sea and air elements. Land-based forces included ICBMs, IRBMs, and MRBMs. The sea-based strategic force consisted of SSBNs. The Air Force's bombers were capable of delivering nuclear bombs but would be unlikely to penetrate the sophisticated air defenses of modern military powers.

China's nuclear forces, in combination with the PLA's conventional forces, served to deter both nuclear and conventional attacks on the Chinese lands. Chinese leaders pledged to not use nuclear weapons first (no first use), but pledged to absolutely counter-attack with nuclear weapons if nuclear weapons are used against China. China envisioned retaliation against strategic and tactical attacks and would probably strike countervalue rather than counterforce targets.

The combination of China's few nuclear weapons and technological factors such as range, accuracy, and response time limited the effectiveness of nuclear strikes against counterforce targets. China has been seeking to increase the credibility of its nuclear retaliatory capability by dispersing and concealing its nuclear forces in difficult terrain, improving their mobility, and hardening its missile silos.

The CJ-10 long-range cruise missile made its first public appearance during the military parade on the 60th Anniversary of the People's Republic of China; the CJ-10 represents the next generation in rocket weapons technology in the PLA.

On 9 January 2014, a Chinese hypersonic glide vehicle (HGV) referred to as the WU-14 was allegedly spotted flying at high speeds over the country. The flight was confirmed by the Pentagon as a hypersonic missile delivery vehicle capable of penetrating the U.S. missile defense system and delivering nuclear warheads.

Two Chinese technical papers from December 2012 and April 2013 show that China has concluded that hypersonic weapons pose "a new aerospace threat" and that they are developing satellite directed precision guidance systems. China is the third country to enter the "hypersonic arms race" after Russia and the United States. The U.S. Air Force has flown the X-51A Waverider technology demonstrator and the U.S. Army has flight tested the Advanced Hypersonic Weapon. China later confirmed the successful test flight of a "hypersonic missile delivery vehicle," but claimed it was part of a scientific experiment and not aimed at a target.

US Air Force National Air and Space Intelligence Center estimated that by 2022 the number of Chinese nuclear warheads capable of reaching the United States could expand to well over 100.

In June 2021, James Martin Center for Nonproliferation Studies has found out that China is constructing new missile silo field in Gansu in western China. According to the satellite picture, 119 missile silos for intercontinental ballistic missiles are under construction near Yumen City. In July, Federation Of American Scientists found out there are another 110 silos being built in Hami, Xinjiang. The two significant expansion projects include silos more than ten times the number of ICBM silos in operation of PLARF today.

In July 2021, China tested globe-circling hypersonic missile including the unprecedented launch of a separate 2nd missile from the ultra-high-speed vehicle according to the Financial Times and Wall Street Journal. The test showed China's development of its strategic, nuclear-capable weapons as more advanced than any had thought, surprising Pentagon officials, the two newspapers said. Neither the United States nor Russia has demonstrated the same ability, which requires launching a missile from a parent vehicle traveling five times the speed of sound. According to reporting by the Financial Times, this weapons system consists of two parts: a fractional orbital bombardment system (FOBS) and a hypersonic glide vehicle (HGV).

Missile ranges

Ranks

Officers

Enlisted

Active missiles 
It is currently somewhat unclear as to whether the Chinese theater commands or the PLARF itself has operational control over the conventional ballistic missile units, though it seems likely that the PLARF acts in coordination with, but not taking orders from, the theater commands with regards to the use of conventional ballistic missiles, with control of nuclear weapons continuing to be exercised at the Central Military Commission level.

Obsolete missiles 
 DF-3A, CSS-2 (IRBM) - In service from 1971 to 2014

Command 
The People's Liberation Army Rocket Force is commanded by Li Yuchao since January 2022 when he was promoted from chief of staff, and by Deputy Commanders Li Jun, Zhang Zhengzhong, and Li Chuanguang, and an unknown chief of staff. PLA Rocket Force Command is also led by Political Commissar Xu Zhongbo and Deputy Political Commissar Yu Guang. Xu became the PLARF political commisar in July 2020 having previously served as the political commissar of the Joint Logistics Support Force (JLSF) and the Western Theater Command. PLARF Command has four direct-reporting units which are not within the command's headquarters nor the subordinate bases: PLARF Staff Department, Political Work Department, Equipment Department, and Logistics Department.

 Staff Department
 Operations Support Group (Unit 96942) in Changping, Beijing
 Reconnaissance Regiment (Unit 96943) in Yanqing, Beijing
 Survey and Mapping (Unit 96944) in Chanping, Beijing
 Communications Regiment (Unit 96946) in Haidian, Beijing
 Electronic Countermeasures Regiment (Unit 96945), in Baoding, Hebei
 UAV Unit in Quanzhou, Fujian
 Automated Command Center in Haidian, Beijing
 New Soldier Training Regiment in Tangshan, Hebei
 Meteorology Center in Changping, Beijing
 Cruise Missile Mission Planning Center (Unit 96941) in Changping, Beijing
 Technical Reconnaissance Bureau in Haidian, Beijing
 Political Work Department
 Organization Bureau
 Cadre Bureau
 Propaganda Bureau
 Military and Civilian Personnel Bureau
 Mass Work Liaison Bureau
 Equipment Department
 Comprehensive Planning Bureau
 Scientific Research and Purchasing Bureau
 Experimentation Supervision Bureau
 Directly Subordinate Work Bureau
 Nuclear Technology and Equipment Bureau
 Logistics Department
 Finance Bureau
 Medical Bureau
 Transport and Delivery Bureau
 Military Infrastructure and Construction Bureau
 Purchase and Supply Bureau
 Functional Bureau
 Combat Service and Planning Bureau
 Directly Subordinate Work Bureau

Unit designators 
Each unit of the PLA maintains both a True Unit Designator (TUD) and a Military Unit Cover Designator (MUCD). A unit's TUD is intended for internal use while the MUCD is intended to be used externally to protect and conceal the true identity of the unit. For example, the first brigade of the Base 61 has the TUD "611 Brigade" and the MUCD "Unit 96711". MUCDs do, however, often reveal the a unit's echelon, mission, and subordination. Although the system has changed at least four times since 1950, current PLARF MUCDs are five digits which begin with '96'. PLARF MUCDs whose third digit is 1–5 are pre-2017 reform and are obsolete.

Order of battle 
The PLARF is organized into nine bases, ordinally numbered from Base 61 through Base 69. The first six bases (61 through 66) are operations bases assigned to the various geographic theater commands of the PRC while three bases (67 through 69) conduct support missions. PLARF bases are typically led by an officer in a Corps or Corps Deputy Leader grade.
Each of the six operations bases maintains a mix of nuclear and conventional armaments specific to their geographic command's mission. For example, as a component of the Eastern Theater Command (responsible for a potential conflict with Taiwan), Base 61 is armed primarily with short-range conventional missiles while the more inland Bases 64 and 66 operate long-range nuclear-capable missiles. These six operations bases are all similarly structured with a base headquarters, staff department, political work department, support department, six to eight subordinate missile brigades, a base hospital, and training, communications, operational support, comprehensive support, and inspection regiments. The operational support regiment in each of the six operations bases provides security, engineering, meteorology, survey and mapping, and chemical, biological, radiological, and nuclear (CBRN) defense. Each base's comprehensive support regiment is responsible for equipment (including vehicles and missile) repair, maintenance, fueling, and storage — the result of a 2017 merge of base repair factories with technical service regiments. Base equipment inspection regiments are responsible for nuclear warhead logistics including storage, maintenance, and distribution at each base. Exceptions to the this standard base structure, Base 61 commands an additional regiment for unmanned aerial vehicle (UAV) operations, Base 63 commands an additional regiment for ICBM liquid fueling, and Base 64 possesses an equipment inspection brigade as opposed to the standard regiment.

Base 61 
Base 61 was founded in August 1965 as unit 121 in Guangyang Township of Shitai County in Anhui Province and is responsible for the construction of missile silos. The base itself was built in June 1966 under Project 303, and was designated as the 52nd Base of the Second Artillery Corp under the Nanjing Military Region on 25 May 1968. In 2016, the PLA Rocket Force assumed authority over the base. On 18 April 2017, under orders from Xi Jinping and the Central Military Commission, the base was re-designated Base 61.

Base 65 
Base 65, headquartered in Shenyang, Liaoning Province, operates with the PLA's Northern Theater Command and stations units in the provinces of Liaoning, Jilin, and Shandong. Base 65 was founded in September 1964 as the 51st Base Command of the Second Artillery Corps (now the PLARF) under the 302 Project, and then approved by committee on November 1. On 25 May 1968, it was transferred to the Second Artillery Force. In 1970, Base 65 moved to Tonghua City in Jilin Province. In 1992, it moved to its current home in Shenyang. It was transferred to the PLA Rocket Force in 2016. On 18 April 2017, under orders from CCP general secretary and CMC chairman Xi Jinping, the base was realigned and redesignated as the 65th Base.

Base 67 
The PLARF operates another base, Base 67, which is responsible for nuclear warhead storage, warhead transport, warhead inspection and nuclear weapon's training. It is believed to form part of the nuclear C3 (command, control and communications) network, though it is unknown if this network is PLARF-only, shared between the PLARF and military commands, or if it used by the Central Military Commission, which is believed to have its own communication system for the nuclear forces.

The main nuclear storage facility is reportedly located in Taibai County, where large-scale tunneling activities have taken place. The main storage depot is apparently under Mount Taibai itself, with related Base 67 facilities spread throughout the rest of the county. It appears that each missile base also has a smaller storage facility and depot.

It is likely that warheads that require maintenance or testing, as well as a centralized reserve stock, are held at the Mount Taibai facility, with relatively few warheads distributed to the bases and brigades. It is likely that missile bases would receive additional warheads from the central depot in times of high tension. It seems that the structure of a main unit in Taibai County, with smaller replica units throughout the bases, is repeated in the transportation units.

Warhead and missile transport in China is heavily reliant on the rail and road systems, likely why a large-scale rail project was constructed in the 1960s by the PLA in the area of Baoji, a large city in Shaanxi province and the location of Base 67's headquarters since that same time period. This became a concern after the 2008 Sichuan earthquake, where the vulnerability of transport networks in Shaanxi province was dramatically proven.

Units believed to be subordinate to Base 67 are:
 Equipment Inspection Institute, called Unit 96411 pre-reform
 Unknown unit, known as Unit 96412
 Technology Service Regiment, called Unit 96421 pre-reform
 Transportation Regiment, called Unit 96422 pre-reform
 Training Regiment, called Unit 96423 pre-reform
 Maintenance Regiment, called Unit 96424 pre-reform
 Communications Regiment, called Unit 96425 pre-reform

Other branches 
 PLARF Special Operation Group, called "Sharp Blade Commando Battalion" is the specially trained units of the PLARF that responds to the highest-risk situations(such as Counter-SOF operations) within a PLARF base, compound or Missile site. also designated to escort of missiles and nuclear weapons, protection of missile/infrastructure.

Command, control, and communications 
The PLARF has operated a separate command and control structure from the rest of the PLA since 1967. The goal of the system is to ensure tight control of nuclear warheads at the highest levels of government. This is done by the Central Military Commission having direct control of the PLARF, outside of the structure of military regions.

For nuclear weapons, the command structure is believed to run from the CMC, to the headquarters of the PLARF in Beijing, from there to each Artillery Base, and from each Artillery Base down to the individual Brigade. From there, the Brigade transmits firing orders to the launch companies under its control. In the case of conventional ballistic missiles, it is reasonable to assume that more autonomy will be provided in wartime, with command likely being issued from the Bases, which are believed to coordinate with their respective Military Regions on targeting and conventional missile use.

Chinese nuclear C3 capabilities are centered around fiber-optic and satellite-based communication networks, replacing older radio command networks that made up the-then Second Artillery's C3 infrastructure before the 1990s. While historically Chinese nuclear missile forces had to launch from pre-prepared sites, the newest generation of nuclear-capable missiles (the DF-26 and DF-31AG) have been seen deploying to, and launching from, unprepared sites in exercises.

This would corroborate reports that PLARF communications regiments are being trained in the ability to set up telephone and command networks "on-the-fly". The reason for these changes likely has to do with concerns about PLARF survivability; China's commitment to a no-first-use policy means that its nuclear forces have to be capable of both surviving a first-strike, and receiving the orders required to fire back.

Transporter erector launchers 
TA580/TAS5380
TA5450/TAS5450
HTF5680A1
WS2300
WS2400
WS2500
WS2600
WS21200 (used exclusively by Pakistan)
WS51200 (used exclusively by North Korea)

Tractor trucks 
Hanyang HY4260
Hanyang HY4330

Operations in Saudi Arabia 
The PLARF Golden Wheel Project (Chinese Wikipedia: 金轮工程) co-operates the DF-3 and DF-21 medium-range ballistic missiles in Saudi Arabia since the establishment of Royal Saudi Strategic Missile Force in 1984.

See also 

 Dongfeng (missile)
 Nuclear triad
 List of states with nuclear weapons
 Qian Xuesen (also known as Tsien Hsue-shen)

References

Citations

Sources

Further reading 
 Federation of American Scientists et al. (2006): Chinese Nuclear Forces and U.S. Nuclear War Planning
 China Nuclear Forces Guide Federation of American Scientists
 Enrico Fels (February 2008): Will the Eagle strangle the Dragon? An Assessment of the U.S. Challenges towards China's Nuclear Deterrence, Trends East Asia Analysis No. 20.

External links 
 Strategic Missile Force SinoDefence.com (WaybackMachine Dec. 2013)
 PLA Second Artillery Corps SinoDefence.com (Dec. 2010)
 Second Artillery Corps FAS.org
 Second Artillery Corps (SAC) NTI.org (WaybackMachine Dec. 2011)

defenseone.com (March,2019)
 

 
4
Strategic forces